The smallhead moray cod, Notomuraenobathys microcephalus, is a species of eel cod found in the Scotia Sea and around the Antarctic Peninsula and Enderby Coast.

References
 

Gadiformes
Monotypic fish genera
Fish described in 1937